Allie Gonino is an American actress and singer. She is known for her regular role as Laurel Mercer in The Lying Game and her recurring role as Michelle in 10 Things I Hate About You, both of which were ABC Family series. Gonino was a member of the American girl group the Stunners between 2007 and 2011. Gonino is currently in the band the Good Mad, who were featured in The Lying Game, in which Gonino also starred.

Early life
Gonino was born  and grew up in Rockwall, Texas. Her parents are Dr. John and Linda Gonino, who own and operate the Gonino Center for Healing in Heath, Texas. At the age of seven she started taking classical violin, and classical ballet lessons. For much of her childhood, she would perform at many of the country music oprys in the Dallas-Fort Worth area, singing, yodeling, and playing fiddle, and mandolin. In her high school years, Gonino became interested in musical theater. One month into her second year, she dropped out of high school to move to Los Angeles, and fully pursue a career in music and acting. At sixteen, she acquired her GED.

Career

In her early career as an actress, Gonino guest starred on the television series Unfabulous, Cory in the House, The Suite Life on Deck, Lie to Me, and had a recurring role as Michelle in the ABC Family series 10 Things I Hate About You. In 2007, Gonino joined the girl group the Stunners which was formed by recording artist Vitamin C. In summer 2010, after the release of their first single "Dancin' Around the Truth" featuring the New Boyz, the Stunners embarked on a 20 date venture as the opening act for Justin Bieber on My World Tour. The group has since disbanded.

Gonino co-starred as Laurel Mercer in the 2011–2013 ABC Family series The Lying Game.  Gonino was also featured in a 2012 Boys Like Girls music video as the female lead for "Be Your Everything". In 2012 she was cast in the movie Geography Club which co-starred her 10 Things I Hate About You castmate Meaghan Martin. In 2013 she was cast to appear in the comedy-drama film See You in Vahalla with Sarah Hyland. Gonino was also cast in a main role on the Sundance Channel drama The Red Road in 2014. In 2015 she was cast in the recurring role of Sam on the fifth season of Freeform's Baby Daddy, but was subsequently replaced in the role by Daniella Monet.

In 2015 Gonino released the EP Hollywood High, which includes the single "Vamp".

Filmography

References

External links 

Actresses from Texas
American child actresses
American child singers
American film actresses
American indie rock musicians
American television actresses
Living people
Singers from Texas
People from Rockwall, Texas
21st-century American women singers
Year of birth missing (living people)
21st-century American singers